Maroc Telecom (Acronym: IAM) is the main telecommunications company in Morocco. Currently employing around 11,178 employees, it is the largest telecommunications network in the country with 8 regional delegations and 220 offices present across Morocco. The company is listed on both the Casablanca Stock Exchange and Euronext Paris.

History

The origin of a Moroccan telecommunications project dates back to 1891, when Sultan Hassan I created the first Moroccan postal service. In 1913, the Moroccan Postal Telephone and Telegraph was established before a Dahir (King's decree) related to the monopoly of the state of Telegraphy and Telephony was published.

In 1967, Morocco placed the first underwater cable between Tetouan, Morocco, and Perpignan, France, through the Mediterranean. A few years later, in 1970, a transmission via INTELSAT was introduced. The Telex service was then automated in 1971 just before installing a digital center in Fes.

Due to the advancement of telecommunications around the globe, Morocco decided to create a new entity called the Office National des Postes et Télécommunications (ONPT) to manage the industry. ONPT was responsible of the introduction of Analog Mobile Radiotelephony in 1987. Later on, in 1992, Morocco set up the first underwater optical fiber cable. Two years later, a GSM service was operational. The Internet was introduced in Morocco by ONPT in 1995.

After the publication of a telecommunications' decree, Maroc Telecom (IAM) was eventually founded in 1998. The acronym IAM comes from its original Arabic name Ittisalat Al Maghrib. The name "Maroc Telecom" was adopted later for better international recognizability.

Privatization
On 20 February 2001, the Moroccan government sold 35% of Maroc Telecom's shares to French mass media company Vivendi. The transaction amounted to 23 Billion dirhams. On 4 January 2005 Vivendi acquired an additional 16% for 12.4 billion dirhams raising its participation to 51%. In October 2007, the CDG ceded, via its subsidiary Filpar Holding, 2% of Maroc Telecom to Vivendi in exchange of 0.6% of Vivendi's shares, putting the total shares owned by Vivendi to 53%.

In 2006, the company reported a turnover of $2.67 bn. The custom base was established at 1.27m lines for the landline and at 391,000 lines for the ADSL.

In July 2013, it was announced that the firm’s majority owner, Vivendi, would sell its 53% stake in the firm to Etisalat for around $4.2 billion.

In 2016, Maroc Telecom introduced fiber optics to the country with speeds up to 200 Mbits/s.

Activities

Land lines
It consists of the provision of public phones throughout Morocco. The fixed park reaches 1.6 million lines.

Mobile phones
Mobile services are provided via a GSM network. Maroc Telecom counted 33 million customers at the end of October 2012. Its network covers 97% of the Moroccan population.
It also has 12.5 million customers in Mali, Gabon, Burkina Faso and Mauritania. It is one of the most profitable phone operators in Africa with a revenue of 2.2 billion euros during the first 9 months of 2012.

Maroc Telecom launched 4G+ in Morocco on July 13, 2015.

Customer support
Customer support does only propose contacting by phone to a special number and not via a contact form like most of telecommunication companies.

Projects and investments
On June 1, 2006, IAM launched the IPTV package deployed by Huawei Technology via the ADSL line. The service was the first of its kind in Africa and the Middle East.

In July 2006, Maroc Telecom signed with the French telecommunications equipment company Alcatel a contract for a submarine cable network connection between Morocco and France. Maroc Telecom's aim is to upgrade the capacity of its services (i.e. broadband services, call centers). The project cost €26 million and was named "Atlas Offshore".

In December 2006, IAM invested in Burkina Faso’s ONATEL, acquiring 51% of its capital.

See also
 Communications in Morocco
 Internet censorship in Morocco
 List of telephone operating companies
 Inwi
 Meditel

References

External links
 Maroc Telecom website
 Euronext analysis

 
Mobile phone companies of Morocco
Telecommunications companies of Morocco
Etisalat
Former Vivendi subsidiaries
Moroccan brands
1998 establishments in Morocco
Telecommunications companies established in 1998
Companies listed on Euronext Paris
Government-owned telecommunications companies
Former government-owned companies